Simranjit Singh (born 25 January 1992) is an Indian footballer who plays as a right back for Delhi FC in the I-League Qualifiers.

Career

Pailan Arrows
Born in Punjab, Simranjit started his footballing career at the St. Stephen's Football Academy Chandigarh in 2004. After graduating from Tata Football Academy Singh joined I-League developmental side Pailan Arrows for the 2012–13 season and he made his debut for the club in the I-League on 20 January 2013 against Shillong Lajong F.C. in which he came off the bench at the 74th minute for Seminlen Doungel; Pailan Arrows won the match 1–0.

Bharat
In December 2014, Simranjit joined newly founded I-League team Bharat FC.

Career statistics

Club
Statistics accurate as of 20 January 2013

References

External links 
 

1992 births
Living people
Footballers from Punjab, India
I-League players
Association football midfielders
Indian footballers
Indian Arrows players
Bharat FC players